Mariela Amina Jácome Riley (born 6 March 1996) is an American-born Ecuadorian professional footballer who plays as a forward and a midfielder. She has been a member of the Ecuador women's national team.

She was part of the Ecuadorian squad for the 2015 FIFA Women's World Cup. She also had a brief stint in the Ecuadorian league playing for San Francisco.

Personal life
Jácome was born in Long Branch, New Jersey to an American mother and an Ecuadorian father originally from Guayaquil. Growing up she attended Ichabod Crane High School in Kinderhook, New York, and in 2013 she was named by Albany Times Union to the all-star senior squad after recovering from Jácome a torn ACL a year before. She later attended St. John's University, where she played 20 games her first season. While visiting family in Ecuador, her uncle recommended that she try out for the Ecuador national team which was holding camp nearby. Jácome did and soon after was named part of the 2015 FIFA Women's World Cup squad.

References

External links
 
 

1996 births
Living people
People with acquired Ecuadorian citizenship
Ecuadorian women's footballers
Women's association football forwards
Women's association football midfielders
Ecuador women's international footballers
2015 FIFA Women's World Cup players
21st-century Ecuadorian women
Soccer players from Boston
American women's soccer players
St. John's Red Storm women's soccer players
American people of Ecuadorian descent
Sportspeople of Ecuadorian descent